Carphochaete bigelovii, common name Bigelow's bristlehead, is a species of North American flowering plants in the family Asteraceae. They are native to northern Mexico (Coahuila, Chihuahua, Durango, Sonora) and the southwestern United States (Arizona, New Mexico, western Texas).

Carphochaete bigelovii is a shrub sometimes reaching a height of as much as 300 cm (10 feet) tall. Flower heads are usually borne 1 or 2 per branch, with disc florets but no ray florets. Florets are generally purple with white lobes around the edge.

References

External links
Southeastern Arizona Wildflowers and Plants
Calphotos photo gallery, University of California

Eupatorieae
Flora of Mexico
Flora of the Southwestern United States
Plants described in 1852